The similarly named Biblical books are located at Books of Kings.

The passage reads: "Now the rest of the acts of Manasseh, and his prayer unto his God, and the words of the seers that spake to him in the name of the LORD God of Israel, behold, they are written in the book of the kings of Israel." 

This book is sometimes called The Acts and Prayers of Manasseh.

This text may be identical to another lost book, the Book of the Kings of Israel, above.

See also 
 Table of books of Judeo-Christian Scripture
 Lost work

References

Lost Jewish texts